Kallstroemia is a genus of flowering plants in the caltrop family, Zygophyllaceae. The approximately 17 species it contains are native to tropical and warm temperate regions of the Americas. The flower and fruit morphology is similar to Tribulus.  The convex fruits separate into about 10 nutlets each with one seed. The genus is named after A. Kallstroem who lived in the 18th century.

Selected species
Kallstroemia californica (S.Watson) Vail – California caltrop
Kallstroemia grandiflora Torr. ex A.Gray – Arizona poppy
Kallstroemia hirsutissima  Vail ex Small – Hairy caltrop
Kallstroemia maxima (L.) Hook. & Arn. – Big caltrop
Kallstroemia parviflora Norton – Warty caltrop
Kallstroemia perennans B.L. Turner – Perennial caltrop
Kallstroemia pubescens (G.Don) Dandy – Caribbean caltrop

References

Further reading
USDA Plants Profile: North American Species
Kearny, T. H., R. H. Peebles et al. (1960) Arizona Flora. University of California Press, Berkeley, CA.

External links
 
 

 
Rosid genera
Taxa named by Giovanni Antonio Scopoli